Ermengol (or Armengol) V (1078 — 1102), called El de Mollerussa ("He of Mollerussa"), was the Count of Urgell from 1092 to his death. He was the son of Ermengol IV and his first wife, Lucy (Lucía) of Pallars.

He spent most of his life in Castile, where he met and married María Pérez, daughter of Pedro Ansúrez, lord of Valladolid, in 1095. During his long absences in Castile, he left the government of Urgell to Guerau II of Cabrera. He died in 1102 at the battle of Mollerussa.

His children were:
Ermengol VI, Count of Urgell
Stephanie (died 1143), first married, probably as early as 1119, as his second wife, Fernando García de Hita, founder of the Castro family. After Fernando died around 1125, Stephanie married Count Rodrigo González de Lara in 1135. In 1143, Stephanie founded the Monastery of Saint Mary of Valbuena.

Notes

References

Sources

 

 
 

1078 births
1102 deaths
Counts of Urgell
11th-century Catalan people